Gerald N. Rosenberg (born 1954) is an American political science and law professor at the University of Chicago, and the author of the 1991 book The Hollow Hope.

Education and career

A Phi Beta Kappa, Summa Cum Laude graduate of Dartmouth College, he holds an M.A. degree in Politics and Philosophy from Oxford University, a J.D. degree from the University of Michigan Law School and a Ph.D. in Political Science from Yale University.  He is also a member of the Washington, D.C. bar.

Rosenberg spent the 2013–14 academic year as a visiting professor at the National Law School of India University in Bangalore, India.  In the 2002–2003 academic year he was awarded a Fulbright Fellowship to teach U.S. Constitutional Law at the Law School of Xiamen University in Xiamen, Fujian, P.R. China.  He has also served as a visiting fellow in the Law Program, Research School of Social Sciences, Australian National University, Canberra, Australia, 1995–1996.

He has lectured extensively, including at the U.S. Supreme Court and in venues in Australia, Canada, China, India and Spain.

The Hollow Hope

The Hollow Hope challenges the widely held belief that the U.S. Supreme Court is an effective agent of social change.  Rosenberg builds an argument that the Supreme Court is structurally constrained from producing social change even when social change plaintiffs win their cases.  Focusing on famous Supreme Court cases, particularly Brown v. Board of Education and Roe v. Wade, The Hollow Hope argues that they didn't produce the significant social reforms that proponents claim for them, and that in fact did result in the wake of those landmark decisions.

The Hollow Hope was awarded the Gordon J. Laing Award from the University of Chicago Press in 1993 for a book published by a University of Chicago faculty member that brings the greatest distinction to the Press.  It was also given the Wadsworth Award by the Law-Courts section of the American Political Science Association (for a publication ten years or older that has made a lasting contribution) in 2003.  In addition, Rosenberg is a 1993 recipient of the Llewellyn John & Harriet Manchester Quantrell Award for Excellence in Undergraduate Teaching from the University of Chicago.

He is also the lead author of a video textbook on American Politics, American Government (with Mark Rom & Matthew Dickinson) (Thinkwell, Austin, Texas, 2001, revised edition, 2007), as well as over thirty articles and book chapters.

External links
UChicago law faculty page
UChicago political science faculty page

1954 births
Living people
Yale Law School alumni
University of Chicago faculty
American legal scholars
American legal writers
University of Michigan Law School alumni
Fulbright alumni